The National Book Award for Poetry is one of five annual National Book Awards, which are given by the National Book Foundation to recognize outstanding literary work by US citizens. They are awards "by writers to writers".
The panelists are five "writers who are known to be doing great work in their genre or field".

The category Poetry was established in 1950 and has been awarded annually save the period 1985 to 1990.

The award recognizes one book written by a US citizen and published in the US from December 1 to November 30. The National Book Foundation accepts nominations from publishers until June 15, requires mailing nominated books to the panelists by August 1, and announces five finalists in October. The winner is announced on the day of the final ceremony in November. The award is $10,000 and a bronze sculpture; other finalists get $1000, a medal, and a citation written by the panel.

There were 148 nominations for the 2010 award.

Winners

1950s

1960s

1970s

1980s 
The Poetry award and many others were eliminated from the program when it was revamped in 1984. It was restored in 1991, now for current-year publications, with a standard five finalists announced a few weeks prior to the main event.

1990s

2000s

2010s

2020s

Repeat winners
See Winners of multiple U.S. National Book Awards

See also
Poetry of the United States
List of poetry awards
List of years in poetry

Notes

References

American poetry awards
National Book Award